Roger Eylove was a Member of Parliament for Bletchingley in November 1414 and March 1416. His son was the MP, Thomas Eylove.

References

14th-century births
15th-century deaths
15th-century English people
15th-century English politicians
English MPs November 1414
English MPs March 1416